Teachers is a British television comedy-drama series, created by Tim Loane and originally shown on Channel 4. The series follows a group of secondary school teachers in their daily lives.

In the first series, probationary teacher Simon Casey (Andrew Lincoln) is the protagonist; later series have an ensemble cast. The cast changes dramatically, with few original characters remaining by the fourth series. While some of these disappearances are explained, others are not.

The first three series are set in the fictional Summerdown Comprehensive, which merges with another school in the fourth series to form Wattkins School. The first three series were filmed at the former Merrywood School and the fourth was filmed at the former Lockleaze school in Bristol, England.

Teachers was nominated for six BAFTA awards between 2002 and 2004, and was nominated for Best Comedy Drama at the British Comedy Awards in 2003. In January 2005, after a muted reception to the fourth series, Channel 4 announced that Teachers would not continue for a fifth series. A short lived American version was aired in 2006.

Since mid-2020 the series has been available on UK and Australian Netflix. The series is also available on All 4 and PlutoTV streaming service.

Cast

Music

Soundtracks
 Teachers: A Class Soundtrack 
 Teachers 2: Back To School
 Teachers 3: A New Term
 Teachers 4: Top of the Class

Episodes

Themes
Like many sitcoms Teachers had certain themes that it maintained through every episode.  These included:
Appearances of animals, particularly donkeys, in unusual places. Others seen include lions, penguins and sheep. In all such appearances, the teachers and students are completely oblivious to these animals.
A staffroom scene early in the episode, usually with an announcement by the head teacher Clare to set up one of the plots or premises of the episode.
The name of the day written in a variety of ways in the scenery, a prop or a body adornment.
Smoking: a lot of the scenes in all episodes, primarily through the first three series, feature members of the cast smoking as they banter
The pub is the setting where nearly every episode of Teachers starts, usually with the teachers having immaturely themed conversations.

Every episode featured contemporary music, usually with clips of at least five songs (regularly including the bands The Bluetones, Terrorvision, The Soundtrack of our Lives, The Killers, The Darkness, Shed Seven, Feeder, The Dandy Warhols, Starsailor, Mercury Rev, The Hives, Athlete, I Am Kloot, The Libertines, Ash, and Supergrass), and the soundtrack to all four series has been released on CD by the shop of Channel 4.

The theme tune is the solo section of The Boy With The Arab Strap by Belle and Sebastian.

Home releases

References

External links
Teachers at Channel4.com
 

2001 British television series debuts
2004 British television series endings
2000s British comedy-drama television series
2000s British workplace comedy television series
2000s British workplace drama television series
British high school television series
Channel 4 television dramas
Channel 4 comedy
English-language television shows
Television shows shot in Bristol
Television series about educators
Television series by Endemol
Television shows set in Bristol